The following is a list of people who held the office of Secretaries-General of the Democratic Progressive Party.

List of Secretaries-General
 Huang Erh-hsuan (28 November 1986 – 28 November 1988)
 Chang Chun-hung (28 November 1988 – April 1992)
 Chen Shih-meng (April 1992– September 1992)
 Chiang Peng-chien (September 1992 – December 1993)
 Su Tseng-chang (December 1993 – July 1995)
 Chiou I-jen (July 1995 – December 1998)
 Yu Shyi-kun (25 December 1998 – 20 May 2000)
 Wu Nai-ren (20 May 2000 – 20 March 2002)
 Chang Chun-hsiung (20 March 2002 – 31 January 2005)
 Lee I-yang (1 February 2005 – 25 January 2006)
 Lin Chia-lung (25 January 2006 – 15 October 2007)
 Cho Jung-tai (15 October 2007 – 15 January 2008)
 Lee Ying-yuan (15 January 2008 – 20 May 2008)
 Wang Tuoh (20 May 2008 – 20 May 2009)
 Wu Nai-ren (20 May 2009 – 20 December 2009)
 Su Jia-chyuan (20 December 2009 – 20 May 2010)
 Wu Nai-ren (20 May 2010 – 20 December 2010)
 Su Jia-chyuan (20 December 2010 – 6 June 2012)
 Lin Hsi-yao (6 June 2012 – 28 May 2014)
 Joseph Wu (28 May 2014 – 24 May 2016)
  (25 May 2016 – November 2018)
Luo Wen-jia (16 January 2018 – 19 May 2020)
Lin Hsi-yao (20 May 2020 – 26 November 2022)
 (since 26 November 2022)

See also
 List of leaders of the Democratic Progressive Party
 List of leaders of the Kuomintang
 List of Secretaries-General of the Kuomintang
 List of general secretaries and chairmen of the Communist Party of China

References